The Chambers Street–World Trade Center/Park Place/Cortlandt Street station is a New York City Subway station complex on the IND Eighth Avenue Line, IRT Broadway–Seventh Avenue Line, and BMT Broadway Line. Located on Church Street between Chambers and Cortlandt Streets in Lower Manhattan, it is served by the:
2, A and E trains at all times
W train on weekdays
3, C and R trains at all times except late nights
N train during late nights

The station also connects to the PATH via the World Trade Center Transportation Hub, and to the nearby Fulton Center via the Dey Street Passageway.



History

IND Eighth Avenue Line 
On December 9, 1924, the New York City Board of Transportation (BOT) gave preliminary approval for the construction of the IND Eighth Avenue Line. This line consisted of a corridor connecting Inwood, Manhattan, to Downtown Brooklyn, running largely under Eighth Avenue but also paralleling Greenwich Avenue and Sixth Avenue in Lower Manhattan.

Work on the IND Eighth Avenue Line began in 1925. Most of the Eighth Avenue Line was dug using a cheap cut-and-cover method. By August 1930, the BOT reported that the Eighth Avenue Line was nearly completed, except for the stations between Chambers Street–Hudson Terminal and West Fourth Street, which were only 21 percent completed. A preview event for the new subway was hosted on September 8, 1932, two days before the official opening. The Chambers Street and Hudson Terminal stations on the Eighth Avenue Line opened just after midnight on September 10, 1932, as the southern terminus of the city-operated IND's initial segment, the Eighth Avenue Line between Chambers Street–Hudson Terminal and 207th Street.

A late-1990s renovation saw prefabricated tile panels installed on the trackside wall of the express platform, with a tile band of Concord Violet bordered in black and "CHAMBERS" in white Copperplate lettering on black tiles on each panel, and on the local platform's walls the new tiles were installed in  sections with a slightly different shade of dark blue violet bordered in black; no station name captions were placed. The trim lines in the entryways and passages use the Concord Violet color rather than the blue violet.

Around 2:00 p.m. on January 23, 2005, a fire destroyed the interlocking plant at Chambers Street. As a result, two-thirds of A trains were canceled or rerouted, including all rush-hour trips to Rockaway Park–Beach 116th Street. C service was completely suspended and replaced by the A and V in Brooklyn and A, B, D, and E in Manhattan. Some newspaper articles blamed the fire on a homeless person trying to keep warm, but that was never confirmed. Until January 28, the MTA rerouted the A to the Rutgers Street Tunnel during late nights. Initial estimates gave a time of three to five years to restore full service because the destroyed equipment was custom-made for the MTA. That was later cut back to six to nine months to bring back normal operations. However, C service and 70% of A service was restored ten days after the fire, and the rush-hour A trips were restored on February 14, with full service returning on April 21. However, effects of the fire continued into 2006 because the equipment had not been replaced.

IRT Broadway–Seventh Avenue Line 
The Interborough Rapid Transit Company (IRT)'s Broadway–Seventh Avenue Line first opened as a shuttle to 34th Street–Penn Station on June 3, 1917. The line was extended south to South Ferry on July 1, 1918; the Park Place station opened on the same date, and was served by a shuttle between Chambers Street and Wall Street, on the line's Brooklyn Branch. The new "H" system was implemented on August 1, 1918, joining the two halves of the Broadway–Seventh Avenue Line and sending all West Side trains south from Times Square. As a result, shuttle service to this station was replaced by through service.

The city government took over the IRT's operations on June 12, 1940.

Between April 3 and October 1, 1999, this station was closed for escalator replacement and a station rehabilitation.

BMT Broadway Line 

The Cortlandt Street station on the Brooklyn–Manhattan Transit Corporation (BMT)'s Broadway Line opened on January 5, 1918. The city government took over the BMT's operations on June 1, 1940.

The station was overhauled in the late 1970s, with repairs made to the structural and cosmetic appearance. The original BMT wall tiles were removed and the "new" station walls contained cinderblock tiles (colored white with small recesses painted yellow), with black and white station-name signs bolted into the recesses. Lighting was converted from incandescent to fluorescent and staircases and platform edges were repaired. Much of the cosmetic change that came with this renovation was undone in a 1998–1999 renovation. In addition to "state-of-repair" work and upgrades for ADA accessibility, the station's original 1918 tilework was restored. Other improvements were made to the public address system, directional signage, and concrete trackbeds.

During the September 11 attacks in 2001, a train operator reported an "explosion" to the MTA's Subway Control Center one minute after the first plane struck the World Trade Center's North Tower at 8:46 a.m. Subway service was halted shortly afterward, and as a result, no one in the subway system died. The station sustained significant damage during the collapse of the World Trade Center. It was closed for repairs, which included removal of debris, fixing structural damage, and restoring the track beds, which had suffered flood damage in the aftermath of the collapse. The station reopened on September 15, 2002.

On August 20, 2005, the station was closed again for installation of the Dey Street Passageway below Dey Street as part of the Fulton Center project. At the same time, the station was made ADA-accessible in both directions. Previously, the station was accessible on the southbound side only via the temporary PATH World Trade Center station's elevator. MTA posters and flyers at that time indicated the station would reopen in the spring of 2006, and later by spring of 2007, but neither reopening schedules occurred. The northbound side of the station finally reopened on November 25, 2009. The southbound platform reopened on September 6, 2011, while continuing excavation along the Church Street side of the World Trade Center site was being performed.

The Dey Street Passageway, outside of the fare control, connects the Fulton Street station complex to the Cortlandt Street station and to the World Trade Center Transportation Hub. It opened on November 10, 2014, while the World Trade Center was still under construction. With the opening of the Dey Street Passageway, ridership at the station nearly tripled, from 1,500,040 in 2014 to 4,270,036 in 2016. On December 29, 2017, the Cortlandt Street station was connected to the other platforms in the complex. That date also saw the opening of a passageway connecting the World Trade Center station with 2 World Trade Center, and passageways connecting the southbound platform of Cortlandt Street to the Transportation Hub's Oculus head house and to 4 World Trade Center. Fare control areas had to be reconfigured.

Station layout

Chambers Street–World Trade Center/Park Place

Cortlandt Street

Exits 
Exits/entrances through turnstiles to Church Street are located in the mezzanine of the IND station, along with a few High Entrance-Exit Turnstiles (HEETs). There are street stairs:
 at all four corners of Church and Chambers Streets
 at both western corners of Church and Warren Streets
 at both western corners of Church and Murray Streets
 at all four corners of Church Street and Park Place; there is also an elevator to the local platform at the southeastern corner
 at the southwestern corner of Church and Barclay Streets
 at the northwestern and southeastern corners of Church and Vesey Streets
 at the northeastern corner of Church and Fulton Streets

There is also a passageway to the PATH station at the extreme southern end of the local IND platform (see ), providing ADA-accessible access to the local platform.

The IRT platform has its own entrance/exit at its extreme eastern (railroad south) end. Here, a staircase and two escalators, none of which are together, lead up to a mezzanine just beneath the street. The staircase splits into two separate staircases at an initial landing and each of those have another intermediate landing. On this mezzanine, there are turnstiles, both regular and HEET (from when the mezzanine had a part-time token booth and the regular turnstiles could not be left unstaffed). A single street stair leads out to the northwest corner of Broadway and Park Place. The signage for this entrance is the only one in the complex that says "Park Place" with bullets only for the 2 and 3 trains. A short staircase in that mezzanine once led to an entrance to the lobby of the Woolworth Building. It has been closed since the September 11 attacks.

Both eastern corners of Church and Dey Streets contain a staircase exit from the northbound BMT platform, and a staircase to the northeast corner of Church and Cortlandt Streets leads to the same platform. The BMT platform is ADA-accessible via the Dey Street Passageway, an underpass that runs to the World Trade Center Transportation Hub and the Fulton Center. An underground passageway also leads to One Liberty Plaza. An exit at the north end of the southbound BMT platform once led to the original World Trade Center's lower concourse, and now leads to the Westfield World Trade Center shopping mall and the World Trade Center subway station.

IND Eighth Avenue Line platforms 
The Chambers Street–World Trade Center station on the IND Eighth Avenue Line is an express station with four tracks and two island platforms, but in an unusual layout: the station has separate island platforms for through and terminating trains. Both island platforms can accommodate  trains. There is a passenger connection between the two platforms at mezzanine level. This passageway also includes the in-system transfer to the IRT station. The only transfer between the local platform and the express platform is available only at the very tips of both platforms, where the two platforms are opposite each other for a few feet. Passengers must walk down the express platform to the southernmost staircase, go up to a different part of the mezzanine, crossover, and then go down a staircase to the northern end of the local platform. This complex transfer is to allow a continued underground mezzanine outside of fare control from the southern end at the World Trade Center, which is just one block west of the Fulton Street station on the IND Eighth Avenue Line, to the most northern street stairs at Chambers and Church Street, which is just one block east of the Chambers Street station of the IRT Broadway–Seventh Avenue Line. The total length of the mezzanine is seven blocks.

Chambers Street

The Chambers Street station serves through trains, which travel to and from Brooklyn. Just north of Chambers Street is a third track between the uptown and downtown express tracks, with connecting switches at both ends, which was used to turn trains when Chambers Street was used as a terminal, before the Broadway–Nassau Street (now Fulton Street) station opened on February 1, 1933. This platform is not wheelchair-accessible but is one block away from the Chambers Street station on the IRT Broadway–Seventh Avenue Line, which is wheelchair-accessible.

World Trade Center

The terminating platform is named the World Trade Center station. It is served by the  train. Southbound local trains reach the platform by ramping underneath the express tracks south of Canal Street station. The northern end of the World Trade Center station has a signal tower and a diamond crossover switch that are roughly at the middle of the through-platform.

The local tracks end at bumper blocks at the south end of the platform. In addition, there is a platform-level passageway on the western side of the station toward the platform's south end, evidence of a former half-length side platform for the western track; while in passenger use as a connection to the rest of the station, the former platform is now fenced off from the rest of the local platform level, and passengers must now use the mezzanine to access the island platform. A connection to the World Trade Center Transportation Hub is also available at the station's south end; this, in turn, gives access to the Fulton Center (via the Dey Street Passageway), the Cortlandt Street station of the BMT Broadway Line, and the WTC Cortlandt Street station on the IRT Broadway–Seventh Avenue Line. Another passageway also leads directly to the southbound BMT Broadway Line platform.

The station was originally named Hudson Terminal or H&M, after the nearby Hudson Terminal of the Hudson and Manhattan Railroad (now the PATH). The IND had planned for a passageway between its Chambers Street–Hudson Terminal stations and the H&M's terminal in the original plan for the Eighth Avenue Line, but construction on the passageway did not begin until 1947. The direct passageway to Hudson Terminal opened in 1949. When the first World Trade Center was completed on Hudson Terminal's site in 1973, the IND station was renamed. Wall tiles reading "H AND M" remained on the walls of the World Trade Center station as late as December 1974, a year after the first World Trade Center was completed. The tiles were initially painted over, but since the station's renovation, they have been covered over.

Accessibility

At the extreme southern end of the station is the exit to the Cortlandt Street station, along with a few High Entrance-Exit Turnstiles (HEETs). Only this platform is ADA-accessible via a ramp installed in 1987, making the station one of the earliest in the New York City Subway system to be accessible to disabled users.

The doors and original ADA-accessible ramp, as well as the structure from the first World Trade Center leading into the station, survived the September 11 attacks. The station itself was not damaged, but it was covered by dust and was subsequently closed. The passageway reopened for a while to provide an ADA-connection from the New York City Subway station to the temporary World Trade Center PATH station, but was closed again when the temporary PATH station closed for a reconstruction. The passageway was then covered in plywood for preservation purposes.

The renovated entrance, leading from the New York City Subway station to the newly rebuilt PATH station's Oculus headhouse as well as to the Westfield World Trade Center, opened on December 19, 2016. The newly reopened passageway retained its pre-9/11 design, save for a door on display that has the words "MATF 1 / 9 13" spray-painted on it (a message from Urban Search and Rescue Massachusetts Task Force 1 of Beverly, Massachusetts, who searched the World Trade Center site on September 13, 2001). There is a plaque above the spray-painting, explaining the message on the door. PATH was required to preserve the passageway's original design as per Section 106 of the National Historic Preservation Act, as a condition for getting funding to construct the Oculus and new stations. The passageway was not  made ADA-accessible again until 2017, as there are twenty-six steps down from the mezzanine to the Oculus headhouse's lobby.

The MTA's elevator to the local platform, at the southeast corner of Church Street and Park Place, connects to the local platform via a long ramp from the main mezzanine shared with Chambers Street, but it was out of service between 2001 and 2018 due to long-term construction on the current World Trade Center.

Presentation on maps

The station has been portrayed in a variety of ways on New York City Subway maps since 1932. Originally, it was shown as a single station called Chambers Street–Hudson Terminal. Starting in about 1948, two stations were shown, Chambers Street–Hudson Terminal for the express trains continuing to Brooklyn, and Hudson Terminal for the local trains terminating at the station. A 1959 map showed two stations enclosed in a box, but a single label. The 1964 and 1966 maps were similar.

On the 1972 map, it once again appeared to be a single station, with the label showing Chambers Street, Hudson Terminal, World Trade Center, and PATH, although the Hudson Terminal office building complex had already been demolished by this time.

On the current map published by the Metropolitan Transportation Authority, it is shown as two separate stations with a free transfer—Chambers Street (served by the A and C trains) and World Trade Center (served by the E train). Signs in the Fulton Center only show the E when pointing toward the World Trade Center station, as the A, C, 2 and 3 trains serve both station complexes.

Oculus mosaics  

There are over 300 mosaics dispersed throughout the IND and IRT stations, which are part of the 1998 installation Oculus created by Kristin Jones and Andrew Ginzel. These eyes were modeled on photographs of the eyes of hundreds of New Yorkers.

According to Jones and Ginzel,

IRT Broadway–Seventh Avenue Line platform 

The Park Place station on the IRT Broadway–Seventh Avenue Line was built on the portion of the line built as part of the Dual Contracts, which is the section south of Times Square–42nd Street. It has two tracks and a single island platform with a line of blue i-beam columns with alternating ones having the standard black name plate in white lettering. Both track walls have a mostly gold trim line along with the "P" tablets at regular intervals.

Northwest (railroad north) of the station, the tracks of this station become the express tracks of the IRT Broadway–Seventh Avenue Line, curving sharply northeast under West Broadway.

The station has a mezzanine at each end. Towards the western end of the platform, two long staircases lead up to an intermediate landing where another, shorter staircase leads up to the main IND mezzanine near the full Oculus mosaic. From here, there is a bank of turnstiles leading to the street stair at the northwest corner of Park Place and Church Street. A staircase in this mezzanine leads down to the extreme southern end of the IND express platform, where another set of stairs can be used to transfer to the local platform.

BMT Broadway Line platforms

The Cortlandt Street station is a local station on the BMT Broadway Line. The station is located under Church Street, between Fulton and Cortlandt Streets. It has two tracks and two side platforms. It is the closest station on the BMT Broadway Line to the World Trade Center. Immediately north of this station, the line utilizes a sharp reverse curve, first turning east under Vesey Street, then turning north under Broadway toward City Hall.

Passageways link this station to three others outside fare control: the World Trade Center PATH station, the WTC Cortlandt station, and the Fulton Street station, all through the Dey Street Passageway underneath the station. The station also contains a free transfer to the Chambers Street–World Trade Center and Park Place stations via the southbound platform.

Nearby points of interest 

 Brookfield Place (formerly World Financial Center)
 Battery Park City
 Century 21 (also near the adjacent Fulton Street station)
 Church Street Post Office
 New York Public Library New Amsterdam Branch
 Saks Fifth Avenue Downtown division
 St. Paul's Chapel
 Woolworth Building
 World Trade Center buildings (see also World Trade Center site)

Notes

References

External links

 
 
 
 nycsubway.org – Oculus Artwork by Jones and Ginzel (1998)
 
 MTA's Arts For Transit – Chambers Street/Park Place
 MTA's Arts For Transit — Cortlandt Street (BMT Broadway Line)

1918 establishments in New York City
1932 establishments in New York City
Cortlandt Street
Financial District, Manhattan
Chambers Street
Park Place
New York City Subway stations in Manhattan
New York City Subway terminals
New York City Subway transfer stations
Railway stations in the United States opened in 1918
Railway stations in the United States opened in 1932
Tribeca
World Trade Center